Welling United Football Club is a professional football club, based in Welling in the London Borough of Bexley, England. The club's first team play in the National League South, at the sixth tier of English football.

History
Welling United Football Club was founded in 1963 by former professional footballer Syd Hobbins. It began as a youth team, playing in the Eltham & District Sunday League on a park pitch from 1963–64 to 1970–71. From 1971–72 to 1974–75, they played in the Metropolitan-London League Intermediate/Reserves Division. In 1975–76, they played in the London Spartan League Reserve Division One. They gained senior status in the London Spartan League in 1976, at Butterfly Lane, Eltham. Welling finished sixth in Division 2 in 1976–77 and was promoted to the Premier Division. In 1977, Welling moved to the Park View Road ground, which had previously belonged to the then defunct Bexley United. They joined the Athenian League in 1978. In 1981, they progressed to the Southern Football League Southern Division.

After just one season at this level the club found itself in the Southern League Premier Division after the league was re-organised. In 1985–86, they won the league title by 23 points and were promoted to the Football Conference.

Although they struggled in the Conference, only twice finishing above 11th place in 14 seasons, they did enjoy cup success during this period, reaching the first round proper of the FA Cup in six successive seasons, on one occasion knocking out Kent's only Football League side, Gillingham. They also made one third round appearance, losing 1–0 at Park View Road to Blackburn Rovers.

The club was relegated in 1999–2000 and returned to the Southern League.

In the 2003–04 season, under the management of former England World Cup player Paul Parker, the Wings finished in the top half of the Southern League Premier Division and was therefore able to claim a place in the newly formed Conference South. In that season, Parker left the club by mutual consent.

Former Coventry City and Republic of Ireland player Liam Daish took charge of the team on a caretaker basis before the permanent position was handed to former Norwich City and Gillingham defender Adrian Pennock, who narrowly missed out on taking the club into the promotion play-offs. Pennock left the club at the end of the 2006–07 season. His last game managing the Wings finished in a 1–1 draw at home to Hayes. Pennock joined Stoke City in a coaching position under his former Gillingham manager, Tony Pulis.

On 16 May 2007, Welling United appointed Neil Smith as the new first team manager. However, after only seven months in charge Smith parted company with the club on 7 January 2008. It was mutually agreed between the club and Smith that his reign as Wings boss would end.

Andy Ford was appointed the new manager of the Wings on 31 January 2008. Despite losing 6–2 to Cambridge City in his first game in charge, Ford guided the Wings to safety and they eventually finished 16th. Welling finished 7th in the Conference South in 2008/09 under the guidance of Ford. After a poor start to the 2009–10 season Ford resigned, stating he didn't think he could achieve what he wanted on the current budget. Jamie Day was announced as the new player/manager in November 2009.

On 12 August 2010, the club was served with a winding-up petition by HMRC, due for a hearing later that month. The Wings were given 14 weeks to pay the outstanding debt to the HMRC, and thanks almost entirely to the supporters were able to raise £60,000 to clear all monies owed. During this period, in a Football Conference Hearing on 16 September 2010, Welling United admitted to a misconduct charge in connection with the outstanding HMRC debt. Resultantly an immediate deduction of 5 points was enforced on the club together with a suspended £5,000 fine.

Despite the Wings having a transfer embargo enforced upon them and also being deducted 5 points by the Football Conference, all within four weeks of the start of 2010–11 season, Jamie Day's side were competitively competing for the Conference South title. However, even though Welling United were in the top 5 for almost half of the season, a string of poor results in the final month of the campaign saw the Wings miss out on a play-off place by one point, with a final position of 6th.

The 2011–12 season ended with Welling in 3rd place and after defeating Sutton United 2–1 on aggregate in the play-off semi-finals they narrowly missed promotion in the final, going down 0–1 to Dartford at Princes Park.

Welling made a return to the top level of non-league football the following season after clinching the Conference South title, 13 years after they last played at the fifth tier of English football. Between 3 November and 5 February, Welling also broke the league's record for consecutive wins with 12 in a row.

In December 2014 Jamie Day left Welling by mutual consent. He was replaced by Jake Gallagher and Jamie Turner as caretakers, but on 21 December it was announced that Jody Brown of Grays Athletic would become manager. On 3 March 2015, Jody Brown was relieved of his duties after just one point in his first nine games. Right back Loui Fazakerley was put in charge for "the foreseeable future".

Welling's first televised home match was played on 8 March 2015 in front of the BT Sport cameras losing 1–0 to Altrincham.

Following an impressive run of results, Fazakerley steered The Wings out of the relegation zone and to Conference Premier safety on goal difference above Alfreton Town. Fazakerley was appointed on a full-time basis the same week.

On 25 January 2016 Loui Fazakerley was sacked after 10 months in charge, with the club in the National League relegation zone and was replaced with former first team coach under Jamie Day, Dean Frost and Barry Ashby as assistant manager. Jamie Turner also came back as goalkeeping coach.  Frost's first match in charge was away against FC Halifax Town and finished 1–1, Welling's first goal and point at The Shay. Frost left the post with 6 matches remaining in the 2015–16 season with the club bottom of the league.

Mark Goldberg was appointed manager for the coming season along with Damian Mathew as his assistant. After a poor start to the season Golberg gave more control to Mathew but that proved short lived as Mathew left the club in the wake of a capitulation from 2–0 at home to Hemel Hempstead Town, losing the match 3–2.  Former manager Jamie Day returned to the club as assistant to Goldberg but results still did not improve. Day was appointed manager, which culminated in a run that saw Day awarded National League South Manager of the Month, December 2016, and talisman Adam Coombes named player for the month.  Day was being assisted by Adrian Pennock, acting as football consultant. In January 2017, more upheaval was to follow when Pennock left for Gillingham, as manager, taking Day with him as assistant. Coach, Harry Wheeler and Tristan Lewis were drafted in to cover in the short term. With the 2016/17 season nearing close, former Charlton Athletic assistant manager Alex Dyer was appointed manager in March 2017. Assisted by Tristan Lewis, Dyer guided Welling for the remainder of the season, and finished the 2016–17 campaign with a 2–0 loss to Dover Athletic in the Kent Senior Cup final.  In May 2017, Jamie Coyle became Welling United manager, with Tristan Lewis appointed to Director of Football. In February 2018 it was announced that Coyle had signed a contract extension to manage the Wings for the 2018–19 season. With the season ended three days earlier, and the club missing out on a play-off berth, it was announced on 1 May 2018 that Coyle had stepped down from his role as first-team manager. On 3 May 2018, Director of Football, Tristan Lewis also left for pastures new, with the club singling out his work; in establishing their academy, and co-managing the team alongside Mark Goldberg, Harry Wheeler, Alex Dyer and Jamie Coyle, for praise.

Steve King was next to be appointed manager, after he joined from recently relegated Whitehawk at the end of May. A successful season was to follow with the Wings finishing in 3rd place and top of the home form table; meaning that the club had qualified for the playoffs for only the second time in its history. In the semi-final at Park View Road, Welling defeated Chelmsford City 3-2 courtesy of a 96th minute Brendan Kiernan penalty, thus setting up a draw in the final away at Woking. The hosts won the game 1-0 after Armani Little scored a free-kick just before half-time. This proved to be King's final game in charge as manager as he was replaced in June 2019 by Goldberg, who returned for his second spell in the dugout.  Bradley Quinton became the club's new manager in January 2020.

Ground
Welling United play their home matches at Park View Road, Welling. This ground has been their home since 1977 when they took over the ground which had been vacated by the defunct Bexley United. Prior to that date the club had played at a community sports ground in Butterfly Lane, Eltham. Having been unoccupied for some time, the new ground was almost derelict.

Erith & Belvedere have been ground sharing since the 1999 season. Improvements were made to the Park View Road ground in 2004, which included a new covered stand.

As a result of severe storms and gale-force winds in December 2006, the floodlights at Park View Road were damaged. Due to safety reasons all the floodlight pylons on the Welling side of the ground were removed. The floodlights were put in place during the month of June 2007 and are fully functional, one pylon positioned in each corner.

During the 2013–14 season, Park View Road had to be changed to keep Welling United in the Conference Premier in the 2014–15 season. These all happened between the months of February and March.

In the close season of 2015–16 both Welling United bars, the boardroom and parking area at Park View Road underwent renovations. In particular the hospitality areas at the ground were fully refitted to cater for match-days, and non-football related events and private bookings.

Sponsorship
The club has a number of sponsors, and the first team wear shirts sponsored by local construction firm SECO Construction, and local IT company D&M Systems. Both firms are in their third year of shirt sponsorship with the club.

Players

First-team squad

Out on loan

Club officials

Backroom staff

Honours

League 

Conference South (Tier 6)
Winners (1): 2012–13
Southern League Premier Division (Tier 6)
Winners (1): 1985–86

Cups 

Kent Senior Cup
Winners: (3): 1985–86, 1998–99, 2008–09
London Senior Cup
Winners (2): 1989–90, 2018–19
London Challenge Cup
Winners (1): 1991–92

Seasons

† – deducted 5 points for financial irregularities
* – average of games where crowds were permitted

Notable former players

Recent managers

Club records
Highest league position:
6th in the Conference National: 1989–90
Highest attendance:
4,100 v Gillingham FA Cup 1st Round, 22 November 1989
FA Cup best performance
Third Round: 1988–89
FA Trophy best performance
Quarter-finals: 1988–89, 2006–07
FA Vase best performance
Third Round: 1979–80

References

External links

 
Football clubs in England
National League (English football) clubs
Sport in the London Borough of Bexley
Association football clubs established in 1963
Southern Football League clubs
Athenian League
1963 establishments in England
Football clubs in London